Ğälimcan Cäğfär ulı İdrisi (Гaлимҗaн Җәгьфәр улы Идриси - also known as Alimcan Idris and Alim Idris; 1887-1959) was a Tatar Islamic theologian, teacher and reporter. He was born in Russian Empire and throughout his life traveled vastly around the world. In Germany during World War I, he was an important figure among the Muslim prisoners at war camps where he operated as a kind of spiritual leader and assisted them in various ways.  Later he also worked for the Nazi government. During 1920s, for a while, Idris became a part of the Finnish Tatar community, where he was known as a demanding teacher and a Pan Turkic figure.

Biography 
Ğälimcan İdrisi aka Alimcan Idris was born in Petropavl, Kazakhstan - during the reign of Russian Empire. His parents were from Tatarstan: Father from Kazan, mother from Buinsk. During the years 1902–1907, Idris studied at a high grade Madrasa in Bukhara. After that, he continued to study theology and philosophy in Istanbul. Later, Idris worked at the Teacher's Institute in Orenburg. In 1912, he again supplemented his knowledge by studying in Europe, for example at the University of Lausanne.

When World War I began, Idris traveled back to Istanbul, where he worked as a reporter at the Pan-Turkic magazine Türk Yurdu.

In 1916, Alimcan Idris settled in Germany, where he operated as a spiritual leader for Muslim prisoners at the Weinberg war camp in Wünsdorf. The camp was originally created for Muslim prisoners who originated from Russia. The prisoners numbered approximately 12 000 and they were mostly Volga Tatars and Bashkirs. The apparent good conditions of the prisoners served as propaganda for the German government. For the prisoners of Islamic faith, there was a separate cemetery at Zahrensdorf, called Efrenfriedhof, where approximately 400 Tatars were buried. In the city, there was also a war camp called Halbmondlager.

During his time at the camp, Idris was a reporter of multiple magazines that were distributed to the prisoners. He also helped the prisoners in various ways; for example, he organized returns to home for them, or the possibility to emigrate to Turkey, and an opportunity to learn German. Idris as well helped some prisoners abroad, like fellow teacher Gibadulla Murtasin, who was captured during the war and transferred to Denmark. Idris was able to bring him and other prisoners to Germany where he could help them better.

In late 1920's, Alimcan Idris moved to Finland where he operated as a teacher for the children of the Tatar community. Among the community, Idris has been described as a demanding teacher and a tenacious spokesman of a "Turkish identity". He was involved in the founding of a school for the children. In 1929, he spoke at a wedding, where he for example stated the following: "..it's a shame that there's no Turkish school in this country, a school where the children of our community could educate themselves..". After the inspiring speech, money was raised and the school was established. In early 1930's, Idris also taught at Narva.

Idris traveled back to Germany, where the Nazi government took advantage of his language skills. Idris worked at the Eastern Division of the Political Department of the German Foreign Ministry (das Orientreferat der Politischen Abteilung des Auswertigen Amts), where he produced anti-semitic National Socialist propaganda. After World War II ended, Idris moved to Saudi Arabia.

Idris went back to visit Finland multiple times during the 1940s and 1950s, especially Tampere, where its Tatar community would invite him to their celebrations. During those times, his favorite song called "Mahbüs şahzade" was always played. It has been interpreted as reminding him of his days at the war camp.

Idris died in Saudi Arabia. He was buried in Munich, Germany, where his children lived.

Alimcan Idris was married to Şamselbenat Idris. They had three children: boys Urhan and Ildar, and a daughter, Gölnar.

Sources

Literature which includes Idris
 Ingvar Svanberg and David Westerlund: Muslim Tatar Minorities in the Baltic Sea Region. 2016. .
 Gerdien Jonker: On the Margins - Jews and Muslims in Interwar Berlin. 2020. .
 Gerdien Jonker: The Ahmadiyya Quest for Religious Progress. 2016. .

External links
 Ğalimcan İdrisi

1887 births
1959 deaths
Russian theologians
20th-century Muslim theologians
Russian collaborators with Nazi Germany